Issachar was, according to the Book of Genesis, the fifth of the six sons of Jacob and Leah (Jacob's ninth son), and the founder of the Israelite Tribe of Issachar. However, some Biblical scholars view this as an eponymous metaphor providing an aetiology of the connectedness of the tribe to others in the Israelite confederation.

Name
Two different etymologies for the name of Issachar have been proposed based on the text of the Torah, which some textual scholars attribute to different sources—one to the Yahwist and the other to the Elohist. The first derives it from ish sakar, meaning man of hire, in reference to Leah's hire of Jacob's sexual favours for the price of some mandrakes. The second derives it from yesh sakar, meaning there is a reward, in reference to Leah's opinion that the birth of Issachar was a divine reward for giving her handmaid Zilpah to Jacob as a concubine. Scholars suspect the former explanation to be the more likely name for a tribe, though some scholars have proposed a third etymology—that it derives from ish Sokar, meaning man of Sokar, in reference to the tribe's perhaps originally worshipping Sokar, an Egyptian deity.

Historical theories
In the Biblical account, Leah's status as the first wife of Jacob is regarded by biblical scholars as indicating that the authors saw the tribe of Issachar as being one of the original Israelite groups; however, this may have been the result of a scribal error, as the names of Issachar and Naphtali appear to have changed places elsewhere in the text, and the birth narrative of Issachar and Naphtali is regarded by textual scholars as having been spliced together from its sources in a manner which has highly corrupted the narrative. A number of scholars think that the tribe of Issachar actually originated as the Shekelesh group of Sea Peoples - the name Shekelesh can be decomposed as men of the Shekel in Hebrew, a meaning synonymous with man of hire (ish sakar); scholars believe that the memory of such non-Israelite origin would have led to the Torah's authors having given Issachar a handmaiden as a matriarch.

Rabbinical interpretations
In classical rabbinical literature, it is stated that Issachar was born on the fourth of Av, and lived 122 years. According to the midrashic Book of Jasher, Issachar married Aridah, the younger daughter of Jobab, a son of Joktan; the Torah states that Issachar had four sons, who were born in Canaan and migrated with him to Egypt, with their descendants remaining there until the Exodus. The midrashic Book of Jasher portrays Issachar as somewhat pragmatic, due to his strong effort in being more learned, less involved with other matters which led him to such actions like taking a feeble part in military campaigns involving his brothers, and generally residing in strongly fortified cities and, depending on his brother Zebulun's financial support in return for a share in the spiritual reward he gains.

The Talmud argues that Issachar's description in the Blessing of Jacob - Issachar is a strong ass lying down between two burdens: and he saw that settled life was good, and the land was pleasant; and bowed his shoulder to bear, and became a servant unto tribute - is a reference to the religious scholarship of the tribe of Issachar, though scholars feel that it may more simply be a literal interpretation of Issachar's name.

In Islam
Some Muslim genealogists link Shuayb to Abraham through both Sarah and Keturah by making Shuayb's genealogy to be Shuayb b. Isaachar b. Midian b. Abraham.

Tomb 
A Samaritan tradition recorded in the late 19th century considered Neby Hazkil near Rameh to be the burial place of Issachar.

See also 
Tribe of Issachar
Sea Peoples
Book of Chronicles

References

External links

Judaism 101:A Glossary of Basic Jewish Terms and Concepts: Yissachar
Issachar at Chabad.org

Founders of biblical tribes
Children of Jacob